Tvarožná is a village and municipality in Kežmarok District in the Prešov Region of north Slovakia.

History
In historical records the village was first mentioned in 1268 when it was settled by Germans. In 1271 it got town rights. The German population was expelled in 1945.

Geography
The municipality lies at an altitude of 676 metres and covers an area of 9.276 km² . It has a population of about 630 people.

External links
http://www.statistics.sk/mosmis/eng/run.html

Villages and municipalities in Kežmarok District